"Diamonds and Pearls" is the title track of American musician Prince and The New Power Generation's 1991 album. The song is an upbeat ballad, given a rock edge with guitar and heavy drumming. It also features the vocals of NPG member Rosie Gaines. The ballad is an expression of love and not lust, as is the theme on some of the other singles from the album. It was a top 10 hit, reaching number three in the US and the top spot on the R&B chart. The pearls in the accompanying music video come from Connie Parente, a Los Angeles jewelry collector and designer.

The B-side is a mix of excerpts of other Diamonds and Pearls tracks, which serves to promote the album. There was no extended version of the song released. The UK B-side included some of the mixes on the "Cream" maxi single.

The repeated lyric "If I gave you diamonds and pearls, would you be a happy boy or a girl?" echoes the lyrics "I'll buy you diamonds and pearls only if you're good girl" from Prince's 1982 song, "International Lover".

Critical reception
In an retrospective review, Patrick Corcoran from Albumism stated that the song's "fairy tale fanfares, sizeable doses of pomp and the delicious interplay between Gaines' and Prince's voices serve up an undeniably touching ballad that delicately and deftly walks the line between sweet and saccharine." Stephen Thomas Erlewine from AllMusic called it a "drippy mainstream ballad" and a "terrific" pop single. Mike Diver for the BBC described it as a "brilliant ballad" in his 2010 review. Larry Flick from Billboard wrote that it is a "soft and soulful lullaby that should keep momentum building at top 40. Once again, Rosie Gaines' vocal support is a true delight." Clark and DeVaney from Cashbox said it is "actually a soulful R&B ballad-gone-mad with der-Prince's guitar work and production." They noted that Gaines is "sounding quite like she needs her own record, something she will no doubt get from her close-knit pals at Paisley." 

Rufer and Fell from the Gavin Report stated that Gaines "absolutely nails her part." Pan-European magazine Music & Media commented, "The melody of this mellow ballad and title track of his new album rings a bell for soul fanatics. It recalls Bobby Goldsboro's famous tune "Summer (The First Time)", as recorded by Millie Jackson on her classic Caught Up album." A reviewer from People Magazine called it a "mushy mess". Jeff Weiss from Pitchfork said it's a "twinkling locket-pop ballad", and "one of those songs they'll play at weddings until we stop using diamond engagement rings and the ocean runs out of pearls." He added, "It's Prince at his best". Rolling Stone described it as a "sultry ballad", that "intricately wedded the singer's love of glitz and glamour with a distinct, ever-evolving pop-R&B sensibility." Tom Doyle from Smash Hits viewed it as "smaltzy over-the-top-balladeering".

Chart performance
"Diamonds and Pearls" was very successful stateside, receiving massive airplay and peaking at number two on the Hot 100 Airplay, and number 11 on the R&B/Hip-Hop Airplay (it was on the decline when the chart first appeared in April 1992). It was a moderate hit in the UK, peaking at number 25.

Track listings
 UK 7-inch
"Diamonds and Pearls" (LP version) – 4:45
"Q in Doubt" – 4:00

 US 7-inch and Japan CD
"Diamonds and Pearls" (edit) – 4:20
"X-cerpts from the Songs: Thunder, Daddy Pop, Strollin', Money Don't Matter 2 Night, Push, Live 4 Love" – 5:04

 UK 12-inch
"Diamonds and Pearls" (LP version) – 4:45
"Do Your Dance" (Housebangers) – 4:23
"Cream" (N.P.G. mix) – 4:54
"Things Have Gotta Change" (Tony M. Rap) – 3:57

 UK CD
"Diamonds and Pearls" (LP version) – 4:45
"2 the Wire" (Creamy Instrumental) – 3:13
"Do Your Dance" (KC's Remix) – 5:58

Charts

Weekly charts

Year-end charts

See also
 List of number-one R&B singles of 1992 (U.S.)

References

Prince (musician) songs
1990s ballads
1991 singles
1991 songs
Contemporary R&B ballads
Paisley Park Records singles
Pop ballads
Song recordings produced by Prince (musician)
Songs written by Prince (musician)
Warner Records singles